Songhuajiang (松花江) could refer to the following locations in China:

Songhua River, sometimes rendered by its pinyin name incorrectly as "Songhuajiang"; major river in the Northeast
Harbin Railway Station, formerly known as Songhuajiang Railway Station
Songhuajiang Subdistrict (松花江街道), Nangang District, Harbin
Songhuajiang, Dehui (松花江镇), town in Jilin
Songhuajiang Township (松花江乡), Bayan County, Heilongjiang